The Quds Governorate, also Jerusalem Governorate, is one of the 16 Governorates of Palestine and located in the central part of the West Bank. The current Governor, appointed by the Palestinian National Authority, is since 2018 Adnan Ghaith, who succeeded to Adnan al-Husayni, appointed in 2008. The Governorate has two sub-districts: Jerusalem J1, which includes the localities within the territory controlled by the Israeli Jerusalem municipality (East Jerusalem), and Jerusalem J2, which includes the remaining parts of the Jerusalem Governorate. The district capital of the Governorate is East Jerusalem (al-Quds).

The total land area of the governorate is 344 km2. According to the Palestinian Central Bureau of Statistics, the governorate had a population of 429,500 residents in 2005, accounting for 10.5% of Palestinians living in the Palestinian territories in 2022 population had risen to 482,854 as official Statistics.

Division 
The Quds Governorate is divided into the sub-districts "Jerusalem J1" and "Jerusalem J2". Jerusalem J1 comprises the parts of the West Bank that were annexed by Israel in 1980 and included within the Israeli municipality Jerusalem. Jerusalem J1 is usually referred to as East Jerusalem. Jerusalem J2 comprises the parts of the Governorate that are not included in J1.

Division by sub-district

Jerusalem J1: Al-Isawiya, Al-Quds (Old City), Ash-Shayyah, As-Sawahira Al-Gharbiya, As-Suwwana, At-Tur, Ath-Thuri, Bab As-Sahira, Beit Hanina, Beit Safafa, Jabal Al-Mukabbir, Kufr A’qab, Ras Al-Amud, Sharafat, Sheikh Jarrah, Shu’fat, Shu'fat Refugee Camp, Silwan, Sur Baher, Umm Tuba, Wadi Al-Joz

Jerusalem J2: Abu Dis, Al-Eizariya, Al-Jib, Al-Judeira, Al-Qubeiba, Al-Ram, As-Sawahira ash-Sharqiya, 'Anata, An-Nabi Samwil, Ash-Sheikh Sa’d,  Az-Za’eem, Beit Anan, Beit Hanina al-Balad, Beit Ijza, Beit Iksa, Beit Surik, Biddu, Beit Duqqu, Bir Nabala, Dahiat Al-Bareed, Hizma, Jaba’, Khirbet Umm Al-Lahem, Mikhmas, Qalandya, Qalandya Refugee Camp, Qatanna, Rafat, the Bedouin community Al-Khan Al-Ahmar, the Bedouin community Jaba’, other Bedouin communities (see Bedouin village 'Arab al-Jahalin).

Division by locality type

Cities
East Jerusalem
Abu Dis
Al-Eizariya
Ar-Ram

Municipalities
Biddu
Beit 'Anan
Bir Nabala
Hizma
Kafr Aqab
Qatanna
Qalandiya

Village councils
'Anata
Arab al-Jahalin
Beit 'Anan
Beit Duqqu
Beit Hanina
Beit Iksa
Beit Sirik
Jaba'
Al-Jib
Al-Judeira
Kalandia
Mikhmas
Rafat
As-Sawahira ash-Sharqiya
Az-Za'ayyem

East Jerusalem neighborhoods

Abu Tor
Beit Hanina
Beit Safafa
Isawiya
Jabal Mukabar
Old City
Ras al-Amud
Sheikh Jarrah
Shu'fat
Silwan
Sharafat 
Sur Baher
At-Tur
Umm Tuba
Wadi al-Joz
Al-Walaja (part of Bethlehem Governorate and East Jerusalem)

Politics

After the 1948 Arab–Israeli War, Jerusalem was divided. West Jerusalem came under Israeli rule and East Jerusalem, including the Old City, was ruled by Jordan until 1967. In the 1967 Six-Day War, Israel occupied the West Bank and unified the two parts of the city.  East Jerusalem, along with other parts of the West Bank and West Jerusalem, were incorporated in one municipality. However, according to an agreement between the PLO and Israel, East Jerusalem's Palestinian residents that wish so are allowed to participate in the PNA elections, and those that have taken up Israeli citizenship can vote in the elections for the Knesset as well.

Gallery

See also
 Positions on Jerusalem
 Jerusalem District

References

External links
Jerusalem governorate List of residential gatherings. Palestinian National Information Centre, 1999. On web.archive.org

 
Governorates of the Palestinian National Authority in the West Bank